The Medal of the 10th Anniversary of People's Poland (Polish: Medal 10-lecia Polski Ludowej) is a former Polish civil state award established by the Council of State on 23 May 1954 to recognize services to the state. 

It was created to mark the tenth anniversary of the post-World War II establishment of communist Poland, identified with the PKWN Manifesto of 22 July 1944. 

The medal was awarded between 22 July 1954 and 22 July 1955. It was disestablished in 1992. 

It was designed by Polish sculptor Józef Gosławski.

Similar medals were later established to mark the 30th anniversary (in 1974) and 40th anniversary (in 1984) of "People's Poland".

References

External links 

 
 
Lista osób odznaczonych "Medalem 10-lecia Polski Ludowej". PREZESA RADY MINISTRÓW z dnia 29 grudnia 1955 r. (in Polish)

1954 establishments in Poland
Civil awards and decorations of Poland
Awards established in 1954
Awards disestablished in 1992
Works by Józef Gosławski